Päivi Virta (previously Halonen; born 3 August 1964) is a Finnish retired ice hockey defenseman and one of the most highly decorated women in the history of Finnish ice hockey. As a member of the Finnish national team she won five World Championship bronze medals and five European Championship medals, four gold and one bronze.

Playing career 
Virta started her premiere league career in the Naisten SM-sarja (renamed Naisten Liiga in 2017) with the Tampereen Ilves in 1982, the same year the league was established. She went on to play in more than 400 games— with Ilves, the Keravan Shakers, Kiekko-Espoo, and the Espoo Blues— in a career that spanned 24 seasons.

Virta saw the Naisten SM-sarja medal podium in every season that she played. She was Finnish Champion fifteen times, more playoff victories than any other player in league history. She also collected six silver Finnish Championship medals and three bronze Finnish Championship.

International play 
Virta played in over 140 international matches with the Finnish national team and won bronze medals at the IIHF Women's World Championships in 1990, 1992, 1994, 1999, and 2000; gold medals at the IIHF European Women Championships in 1989, 1991, 1993, and 1995; and a bronze medal at the 1996 IIHF European Women Championships.

Awards and honors

In 2004 Virta was the first women's hockey player ever to be awarded the Finnish Ice Hockey Association President's Trophy, annually bestowed upon a person who has made significant contributions to Finnish ice hockey. She is also one of fewer-than-ten women to have been inducted to the Hockey Hall of Fame Finland and thus to be named a Suomen Jääkiekkoleijona (Finnish Ice Hockey Lion).

The Finnish Ice Hockey Association presents the Päivi Halonen Award to the Naisten Liiga Defenseman of the Year.

References 
Significant content in this article is translated from the existing Finnish Wikipedia article at :fi:Päivi Virta; see its history for attribution.

External links

Living people
1964 births
Finnish women's ice hockey defencemen
Ice hockey people from Tampere
Espoo Blues Naiset players
Kiekko-Espoo Naiset players
Keravan Shakers players
Ilves Naiset players